Roermond is a railway station located in Roermond, Netherlands. The station was opened on 21 November 1865 and is located on the Maastricht–Venlo railway and the Weert–Roermond railway. Train services are operated by Nederlandse Spoorwegen and Arriva. The station is the second-busiest in Limburg.

Train services
The following train services call at this station:
Express services:
Intercity: (Schagen–)Alkmaar–Amsterdam–Utrecht–Eindhoven–Maastricht
Intercity: Enkhuizen–Amsterdam–Utrecht–Eindhoven–Maastricht
Intercity: Enkhuizen–Amsterdam–Utrecht–Eindhoven–Heerlen
Local services:
Stoptrein: Roermond–Sittard–Maastricht Randwyck
Stoptrein: Nijmegen–Venlo–Roermond

External links
NS website
Dutch public transport travel planner

Railway stations in Limburg (Netherlands)
Railway stations opened in 1865
Railway stations on the Staatslijn E
Buildings and structures in Roermond
Transport in Roermond